"Housewife" arrived in August 2010 as a one-off release, and their fourth single overall, by the four-piece incarnation of British indie rock band The Cribs. On 9 August 2010, BBC Radio 1 DJ Zane Lowe announced during his show that he would play a brand new song that night, something previously hinted at on the official band website several days previously. The release took fans and critics by surprise due to the secretive nature of the release.

Physical release
Recorded at West Heath Studios, London by Ryan with assistance from frequent collaborator Edwyn Collins, John O'Mahony mixed the song at Sunset Sound Factory, Hollywood, California. The vinyl received the catalogue number 'WEBB271S'. A traditional set-up for the band, except with Ryan providing work on organ.

Etching and poem
Unlike the majority of Cribs releases, the 7" vinyl featured no b-side. Instead, an etching appeared with the words 'SCAM', in addition to a message on the run-out groove stating 'insert me into your computer for additional content'. A poem, containing allusions to the song, appears on the back cover. The cover art featured Ryan and Gary dressed as the title of the single suggests, shot by Pat Graham, with the sleeve designed by Nick Scott, receiving assistance by Owen Richards, Corrado and Nell Frizzell.

Track listing

References

External links
official band website
official record label website

2010 singles
The Cribs songs
Songs written by Johnny Marr
Songs written by Gary Jarman
Songs written by Ross Jarman
Songs written by Ryan Jarman
2010 songs
Wichita Recordings singles